The third season of Shark Tank aired on Network Ten from 20 June 2017. The series was confirmed following the season 2 finale.

Summary

The show features a panel of potential investors, named "Sharks", who listen to entrepreneurs pitch ideas for a business or product they wish to develop. These self-made multi-millionaires judge the business concepts and products pitched and then decide whether to invest their own money to help market and mentor each contestant.

Investments by Shark
 Correct as of Episode 9

Episodes

Episode 1

Episode 2

Episode 3

Episode 4

Episode 5

Episode 6

Episode 7

Episode 8

Episode 9

Episode 10

Episode 11

Episode 12

Episode 13

Ratings

References

2017 Australian television seasons